The Queensland Railways C16 Baldwin class locomotive was a class of 2-8-0 steam locomotives operated by the Queensland Railways.

History
In 1882, the Baldwin Locomotive Works delivered two 2-8-0 to the Queensland Railways’ Central Railway at Bowen. Per Queensland Railway's classification system they were designated the C16 class, C representing they had four driving axles, and the 16 the cylinder diameter in inches.

A third purchased by contractor O’Rourke & McSharry, was purchased for the Central Railway in December 1887. The latter was sent to North Ipswich Railway Workshops in July 1888 for overhaul, but did not return entering service with the Southern & Western Railway. All were reboilered in 1900. They were transferred to the Maryborough / Bundaberg area hauling limestone trains to the Mount Morgan gold mine. All were withdrawn in the 1920s.

Class list

References

Baldwin locomotives
Railway locomotives introduced in 1882
C16
2-8-0 locomotives
3 ft 6 in gauge locomotives of Australia